FMW may refer to:
 Frontier Martial-Arts Wrestling, a Japanese professional wrestling promotion
 Fusion Middleware, a software package from Oracle Corporation
 Federation of Fighting Youth (Polish: Federacja Młodzieży Walczącej), a radical anticommunist organization of Polish youth